Sultandağı District is a district of Afyonkarahisar Province of Turkey. Its seat is the town Sultandağı. Its area is 928 km2, and its population is 14,279 (2021).

Composition
There are three municipalities in Sultandağı District:
 Dereçine
 Sultandağı
 Yeşilçiftlik

There are 11 villages in Sultandağı District:

 Akbaba
 Çamözü
 Çukurcak
 Doğancık
 Karakışla
 Karapınar
 Kırca
 Taşköprü
 Üçkuyu
 Yakasinek
 Yenikarabağ

References

External links
 District governor's official website 

Districts of Afyonkarahisar Province